The Raid on Short Hills (June 21–23, 1838) was an incursion and attack by the Hunter Patriots on the Niagara Peninsula during the Upper Canada Rebellion.

On June 11, 1838, Irish American James Morreau led a rebel raiding party of 26 Hunter Patriots across the Niagara River into Upper Canada. Morreau was aided by Samuel Chandler, a wagon maker from the village of St Johns in Thorold Township, Upper Canada.  The party soon reached Pelham Township where they camped in the woods. Their intention was to get the locals to rise up in rebellion.

The night of June 21/22 the Patriots, in three groups, attacked a detachment of Queen's Lancers lodged at John Osterhout's (Inn and) tavern in St Johns. After a brief fire fight, the raiders attempted to set fire to the building - persuading the Lancers to surrender.  Realizing the threat of imminent capture, the Patriots then fled westward towards Hamilton.

At dawn, the Lincoln Cavalry, Gore District militia volunteers sent by MC Nab (3rd Gore Regiment, 11th Gore (Township of Beverley) Regiment, Queen's Own Regiment Incorporated Militia and the Queen's Rangers), Queen's Lancers, and Natives from the Grand River were deployed to hunt down the Patriots. In short order, 31 Patriots were captured, bringing an end to the invasion. The leaders were gaoled at Niagara, and the rest at Drummondville (Niagara Falls, Ontario).  Among the Patriots arrested were Chandler and Morreau. Chandler was later tried and sentenced to banishment to Tasmania for life, while Morreau was executed on July 30 in Niagara. Chandler escaped back to the United States, settled in Michigan and Iowa where he lived out his life.

James Morreau's grave is in the Catholic cemetery (Saint Vincent de Paul) at present day Niagara-on-the-Lake, Ontario.

The scene of the action at St Johns on Holland Road is unmarked. The Inn has been demolished along with many buildings in St Johns.

References

External links
Chronology of Events of the 1837 rebellions 
The Short Hills Affair

1838 in Canada
Short Hills
Upper Canada Rebellion
Short Hills
Short Hills
June 1838 events
Short Hills